The John C. Zacharis First Book Award honors the best first book of poetry or fiction by a Ploughshares writer. The award carries a cash prize of $1,500, and feature publication in the "Postscripts" section of the Winter issue.  It was started in 1991.

References

American literary awards
Awards established in 1991
American poetry awards
Short story awards
1991 establishments in the United States
First book awards